Kaljo Põllu (28 November 1934 in Kopa, Hiiumaa – 23 March 2010) was an Estonian artist. In 1962 he received a diploma in glass art, and became director of art cabinet of Tartu State University; he founded the contemporary artist's group Visarid in 1966 in Tartu. In 1973 he moved to Tallinn, where from 1975 to 1996 he taught drawing in the Estonian Academy of Arts; at this point his art changed in style dramatically as he searched for influences from the ancient Finnic culture.

In 2007 the University of Tartu gave Põllu their "Contribution to Estonian National Identity" award.

Creative career
 1959–1962 first independently created graphic and painting works during studies in the art academy

Tartu period
 1962–1975 graphic works on impressions from travels in Estonia, Koola peninsula and Transcaucasia
 1963–1972 abstract, pop-like and op-like graphic artwork and paintings
 1967–1972 establishing and directing the artistic group "Visarid"
 1973–1975 collection "Kodalased" ("People at Home") of mezzotinto graphic works (25 works)

Tallinn period
 1978–1984 collection "Kalivägi" ("Kali People") of mezzotinto graphic works (65 works)
 1987–1991 collection "Taevas ja maa" ("Heaven and Earth") of mezzotinto graphic works (40 works)
 1991–1995 collection "Kirgastumine" ("Enlightenment") of mezzotinto graphic works (47 works)
 1994–2008 created more than 100 paintings on figurative impossibleness and seemingly three-dimensionality
 1998–2003 establishing and directing the artistic group "YDI"

Personal exhibitions outside Estonia (selection; all graphics exhibitions)
 1972 exhibition of ex libris by Kaljo Põllu in Frederikshaven (Denmark)
 1972 exhibition of graphics together with Allex Kütt in the central exhibition hall of all-Soviet Artists Union (25 Gorki Str., Moscow)
 1984 exhibitions in the library of Helsinki University (Finland) and in Stavanger (Norway)
 1985 exhibition in Jyväskylä (Finland)
 1986 exhibition in Södertäle Art Hall (Sweden)
 1987 exhibitions in Kymenlaakso (Finland); in Göteborg Art Museum, Västerbotten and in Örebro (Sweden)
 1989 exhibition in Alta (Norway)
 1990 exhibitions in Suomi Gallery and in Folkens Museum (both in Stockholm, Sweden); in Nordic House (Reykjavik, Iceland); during the VII International Fenno-Ugric Congress in Debrecen (Hungary)
 1991 exhibitions in Oulu town library and in the art gallery "Pinacotheca" of Jyväskylä University (Finland); in Szombathelys (Hungary)
 1992 exhibitions in Qaqortoq (Greenland/Denmark); in Seattle and Hancock-Michigan (USA); in Sorbonne Centre of Paris University (France)
 1993 exhibition in Palm Beach Community College Florida (USA)
 1994 exhibitions in Grazi Minorite Monastery (Austria), in Kammel Dok architecture centre (Copenhagen, Denmark)
 1995 exhibitions in Finnish embassy in Paris (France), in Museum für Völkerkunde (Wien, Austria), during the VII International Fenno-Ugric Congress in Jyväskylä (Finland), in Barcelona University (Spain)
 1996 exhibition in Sevilla and Salamanca University (Spain)
 2001 exhibition in Budapest (Hungary)
 2002 exhibition in Dublin National Theatre (Ireland)

Exhibition catalogues published outside Estonia about Kaljo Põllu

There have been published approx. 30 titles on Kaljo Põllu's artwork in newspapers and journals outside Estonia.

References

External links
. In Estonian. English translation of abstract at Directory of Open Access Resources.

. Translated by Liina Viires.

. Interview with Põllu.

.

1934 births
2010 deaths
20th-century Estonian male artists
21st-century Estonian male artists
People from Hiiumaa Parish
Academic staff of the University of Tartu
Recipients of the Order of the National Coat of Arms, 5th Class